Goodenia grandiflora, commonly known as large-flowered goodenia, pinnate goodenia or mountain primrose, is a species of flowering plant in the family Goodeniaceae and is endemic to Australia. It is an erect under-shrub with toothed, egg-shaped to round leaves and racemes or thyrses of yellow, white or purplish flowers.

Description

Taxonomy and naming
Goodenia grandiflora was first formally described in 1805 by John Sims in the Botanical Magazine. The specific epithet (grandiflora) means "large-flowered".

Distribution and habitat
This goodenia grows in rocky places on hills in the Northern Territory, Queensland and eastern New South Wales.

Conservation status
Goodenia grandiflora is classified as "Priority One" by the Government of Western Australia Department of Parks and Wildlife, meaning that it is known from only one or a few locations which are potentially at risk, but as of "least concern" in the Northern Territory and Queensland.

References

grandiflora
Flora of New South Wales
Eudicots of Western Australia
Flora of the Northern Territory
Flora of Queensland
Plants described in 1805
Taxa named by John Sims (taxonomist)
Endemic flora of Australia